In the Fishtank 11 is an EP by The Black Heart Procession and Solbakken.

Track listing
 "Voiture En Rouge" – 5:48
 "Dog Song" – 3:21
 "Nervous Persian" – 5:38
 "A Taste of You and Me" – 3:58
 "Things Go on with Mistakes" – 10:56
 "Your Cave" – 4:32

References

External links
Konkurrent

11
2004 EPs
Konkurrent albums
The Black Heart Procession albums
Split EPs